Reemtsma may refer to:

 Reemtsma, a tobacco company.
 Keith Reemtsma (1925–2000), transplant surgeon.
 Jan Philipp Reemtsma (born 1952), German literary scholar and political activist.